The 2012 Supercopa de España was a two-legged Spanish football match-up that took place on 23 and 29 August 2012 between the champions of 2011–12 La Liga, Real Madrid, and the winner of the 2011–12 Copa del Rey, Barcelona. Barcelona and Real Madrid drew 4–4 on aggregate, with Real Madrid winning on away goals for their ninth Supercopa de España title. This was the first occasion the trophy was won on the away goals rule.

Match details

First leg

Second leg

See also
El Clásico
2012–13 FC Barcelona season
2012–13 Real Madrid CF season

References

2012–13 in Spanish football cups
FC Barcelona matches
Real Madrid CF matches
2012
El Clásico matches